Margaret Mann (4 April 1868, in Aberdeen, Scotland – 4 February 1941, in Los Angeles, California), was a Scottish-American actress.

Biography

Margaret Mann starred in a number of major silent films such as Black Beauty in 1921 and played the lead role in John Ford's 1928 drama Four Sons, one of John Wayne's first films. She often played kind-hearted or suffering motherly roles. With the advent of sound films her roles got notably smaller and she was often uncredited. She portrayed the kindly grandmother Mrs. Mack in two Our Gang comedies in 1931. She also played bit parts in movies like Frankenstein, You Can't Take It With You, Gone with the Wind and Mr. Smith Goes to Washington (1939). Her last of over 80 movies was The Remarkable Andrew (1942), released one year after her death.

Personal life
Mann died of cancer in 1941, aged 72. Not much about her private life is known, although a press release of 1928 said that Mann lived through many tragedies and hardships in her life. Her spouse was James F. Smythe.

Selected filmography

 The Skylight Room (1917) - Miss Longnecker
 The Heart of Humanity (1918) - Widow Patricia
 The Right to Happiness (1919) - Mother Hardy
 The Red Lane (1920) - Minor Role
 Once to Every Woman (1920) - Mother Meredith
 Black Beauty (1921) - Mrs. Blomefield
 Man, Woman & Marriage (1921) - The Mother
 The Smart Sex (1921) - Mrs. Haskins
 Desert Blossoms (1921) - Mrs. Thornton
 The Millionaire (1921) - Grandmother
 The New Disciple (1921) - Marion Fanning
 The Call of Home (1922) - Gerry's Mother
 Don't Write Letters (1922) - Aunt Jane
 Love in the Dark (1922) - Mrs. Horton
 Officer 444 (1926) - Senior Nurse
 The Scarlet Letter (1926) - Townswoman (uncredited)
 Upstream (1927) - Theatre Audience Spectator (uncredited)
 Annie Laurie (1927) - Second Midwife (uncredited)
 Four Sons (1928) - Mother Bernle
 The Wind (1928) - Townswoman at Shindig (uncredited)
 The River (1928) - Widow Thompson
 Disraeli (1929) - Queen Victoria (uncredited)
 Romance (1930) - Opera Audience Member (uncredited)
 Men of the North (1930) - Mother Macheney (uncredited)
 Helping Grandma (1931, Short) - Mrs. Margaret Mack (storekeeper)
 Born to Love (1931) - White Haired Mother at Train Station (uncredited)
 Fly My Kite (1931, Short) - Margaret 'Grandma' Mann
 Five and Ten (1931) - Weeping Woman (uncredited)
 Broadminded (1931) - Huntington Hotel Guest (uncredited)
 The Brat (1931) - Housekeeper
 Expensive Women (1931) - Flower Seller (uncredited)
 Bad Company (1931) - Kingston Hotel Resident (uncredited)
 Frankenstein (1931) - Mourner (uncredited)
 West of Broadway (1931) - Justice of Peace's Wife (uncredited)
 Husband's Holiday (1931) - The Cook (uncredited)
 Secret Menace (1931) - Mrs. Jenkins
 Forbidden (1932) - Hospital Visitor (uncredited)
 Hotel Continental (1932) - Hotel Guest (uncredited)
 Stranger in Town (1932) - Mrs. Robinson (uncredited)
 If I Had a Million (1932) - Idylwood Resident (uncredited)
 Uptown New York (1932) - Elderly Woman (uncredited)
 Bachelor Mother (1932) - Mrs. Price
 Rasputin and the Empress (1932) - One of the Czarevetch's Nurse (uncredited)
 The Mysterious Rider (1933) - Mrs. Morgan (uncredited)
 Mystery of the Wax Museum (1933) - Wax Figure of Queen Victoria (uncredited)
 Pilgrimage (1933) - Mrs. Quincannon (uncredited)
 Torch Singer (1933) - Miss Thomas, Little Sally's Nanny (uncredited)
 Fugitive Lovers (1934) - Blind Man's Wife (uncredited)
 Beloved (1934) - Countess von Brandenburg
 Guilty Parents (1934) - Juror (uncredited)
 I Hate Women (1934) - Ma
 The World Moves On (1934) - Housekeeper (uncredited)
 One More River (1934) - Old Lady at Grave (uncredited)
 Pursued (1934) - Tourist (uncredited)
 Charlie Chan in London (1934) - Housemaid (uncredited)
 Judge Priest (1934) - Governess (uncredited)
 Love Time (1934) - Housemaid (uncredited)
 The Painted Veil (1934) - Mother Superior (uncredited)
 Little Men (1934) - The Nurse (uncredited)
 The Gay Bride (1934) - $100 Recipient (uncredited)
 The Man Who Reclaimed His Head (1934) - Granny (uncredited)
 Life Returns (1935) - Flower Vendor (uncredited)
 Kentucky Blue Streak (1935) - Mrs. Martha Bradley
 The Murder Man (1935) - Investor (uncredited)
 Bonnie Scotland (1935) - Housekeeper (uncredited)
 The Bohemian Girl (1936) - Arnheim's Mother (uncredited)
 Song and Dance Man (1936) - Old Theatrical Woman (uncredited)
 The Country Doctor (1936) - Townswoman (uncredited)
 Florida Special (1936) - Old Lady (uncredited)
 The Law Rides (1936) - Mrs. Lewis
 The Phantom Rider (1936, Serial) - Homesteader's Wife (uncredited)
 Hollywood Boulevard (1936) - Old Woman in Casting Office (uncredited)
 Undercover Man (1936) - Mrs. Grady (uncredited)
 Theodora Goes Wild (1936) - Grandma - Townswoman at Train Station (uncredited)
 Pennies from Heaven (1936) - White-Haired Woman (uncredited)
 Conflict (1936) - Ma Blake
 Let Them Live (1937) - (uncredited)
 Gun Lords of Stirrup Basin (1937) - Aunt Hattie (uncredited)
 You Can't Take It with You (1938) - Neighbor (uncredited)
 Federal Man-Hunt (1938) - Mrs. Ganter
 Charlie Chan at Treasure Island (1939) - Airplane Passenger (uncredited)
 Mr. Smith Goes to Washington (1939) - Nun with Cheering Orphan Boys (uncredited)
 Gone with the Wind (1939) - Woman Writing Letter at Atlanta Church Hospital (uncredited)
 The Remarkable Andrew (1942) - (uncredited) (final film role)

References

External links

Margaret Mann at Virtual History

Scottish emigrants to the United States
People from Aberdeen
1868 births
1941 deaths
Deaths from cancer in California
20th-century American actresses
Actresses from Los Angeles
Scottish television actresses
American television actresses
Scottish film actresses
American film actresses
20th-century Scottish actresses
Our Gang